Tenochtitlan-class patrol vessels (also known as Mexican Navy 42 metre patrol vessels) is a Mexican Navy class of patrol vessels in 2012, that is based on the Damen Stan 4207 patrol vessel design. Over a dozen navies, coast guards and other government agencies operate vessels based on this design.  While some of those vessels are equipped for purely civilian patrols, the Mexican vessels are armed with a pair of Browning M2 machine guns, and a jet-boat pursuit craft that can be launched and retrieved via a stern launching ramp, while the vessel is underway.

Some reports assert the Mexican vessels are based on the same design as the United States Coast Guard's s..  While similar in many respects, the Sentinel cutters are based on the Damen Group's 47 metre patrol vessel.

As of the summer of 2017 ten vessels had been ordered, of which ten have been delivered and commissioned.

Ships

References

Patrol vessels of the Mexican Navy
Patrol boat classes